Junglist is a slang term which first referred to a person living in an area of West Kingston, Jamaica, called Jungle. It was later used as a term to refer to someone who is a dedicated listener of jungle and/or drum & bass music. Tracks from this genre often contain calls and references to the "original junglists" and "jungle soldiers".

History

The term itself is connected with the origin of the name jungle. During the time of junglists, they were sometimes referred to as "rude bwoii", a slang term originally used by Jamaicans (as rude boy), meaning "gangsta" or "badbwoy" ("bad boy"). The term refers to an inner city area of West Kingston, Jamaica, called Jungle (the subject of the Bob Marley song "Concrete Jungle", from the Wailers album Catch a Fire).

'Junglist' developed into a slang term for outlaw toughs who have ostensibly survived- or operate according to the 'law of the jungle'. Certain tracks made references to the "original rudebwoys" or "original gangstas" as denoting particularly respected junglists. Most members of this sub-culture took great pride in the music created by jungle producers.

Unlike some urban styles of music, drug-dealing is rarely mentioned in drum and bass tracks, but several MCs sometimes feature lyrics in relation. The only generally accepted illegal activity in the subculture are drug use and graffiti. Junglists often consume cannabis perhaps arising from the reggae roots of jungle music. Other terms applied to junglists in varying degrees are "ravers" or "drum and bassheads".

Junglists belong to what is seen as a predominantly UK-based drum and bass subculture. As a subculture, however, it is not nearly as distinct as goth or punk to the untrained eye, where members can often distinguish each other by their mannerisms and fashion without hearing their choice of music. Many of those who identify as Junglists adopt a mix of rasta, rudebwoy and B-Boy fashions since jungle, drum and bass and hip hop have close ties as subcultures.

Ali G could be seen as a parody junglist (e.g. dressing in camouflage and listening to loud drum and bass music in his car; M-Beat and General Levy's "Incredible" was played in the Ali G feature film and appearing on its soundtrack), though he could also be treated as a parody of an avid hip hop listener.

References

External links
Concrete Jungle
Junglist Download

Drum and bass
Musical subcultures